Susan E. Leeman (born May 9, 1930) is an American endocrinologist considered one of the founders of neuroendocrinology.

Early life and education 
Susan Leeman was born Susan Epstein in Chicago in 1930. Her mother was born in the United States and her father had emigrated from Russia to New York City. Her father was an academic metallurgist and her mother attended college at George Washington University at a time when few other women did. When Leeman was six weeks old she and her family moved to Columbus, Ohio before moving to Bethlehem, Pennsylvania when she was six. A Jewish family, they were the target of antisemitism.

Leeman received her bachelor's degree from Goucher College 1951 and her master's degree and PhD from Radcliffe College in 1954 and 1958 respectively.

Career 
Leeman began her career at Harvard University in 1958 but moved to Brandeis University the following year where she stayed for the next 12 years. In 1972, having not yet received a full position, Leeman returned to Harvard as an assistant professor until 1980. She then left the medical school when she realised that she would not be offered a tenure there either, gaining a tenured professorship in physiology at the University of Massachusetts Medical School. In 1992 Leeman left Massachusetts to help start the pharmacology department at Boston University.

In 1974 Leeman discovered the structure of substance P – a peptide whose discovery won Ulf von Euler the Nobel Prize in 1970. She also discovered another peptide, neurotensin.

As a result of her work Leeman is considered one of the founders of the field of neuroendocrinology.

Awards 
Leeman became the first woman elected to the National Academy of Sciences in physiology and pharmacology in 1991. She was elected to the American Academy of Arts and Sciences in 1987. In 1993 she won the FASEB Excellence in Science Award and in 2005 won the Committee on Women in Neuroscience's Mika Salpeter Lifetime Achievement Award.

References

External links 
Susan Leeman's autobiography

1930 births
Living people
American endocrinologists
Women endocrinologists
20th-century American women scientists
Goucher College alumni
Radcliffe College alumni
Members of the United States National Academy of Sciences
21st-century American women